Richard Ferdinant Felchlin (October 9, 1888 – January 6, 1960) was born in Stockton, California. He was a civil engineer who designed many of the buildings that give downtown Fresno, California its architectural character. He studied civil engineering at the University of California, then moved to Fresno and entered practice.

Notable buildings
Felchlin and his Fresno company R.F. Felchlin Company (later Felchlin, Shaw, & Franklin) designed many notable Fresno commercial and residential buildings, a number of which are now on the National Register of Historic Places.

Commercial buildings designed by Felchlin and his firm include the San Joaquin Light and Power Corporation Building (1923), the Bank of Italy building (1918), and the California Hotel (1922), which are all on the National Register, and Fresno Pacific Towers (1925) which stood as the tallest structure in the city for 80 years.  A notable residence that is also on the National Register the Kindler home.

See also
List of Registered Historic Places in California#Fresno County

References

1888 births
1960 deaths
20th-century American architects
American civil engineers
People from Stockton, California
Engineers from California